Daisy Veerasingham is a British businesswoman who has been the president and CEO of the Associated Press since 2021, succeeding Gary Pruitt.

Life 
She worked for LexisNexis and the Financial Times. In 2004, she was a sales director for the AP. By 2019, she was senior vice president and chief revenue officer for the company. She was later executive vice president and chief operating officer.

References 

Living people
Associated Press people
British women chief executives
British women journalists
Financial Times people
20th-century births
Year of birth missing (living people)